Morobi Refugee Settlement is a refugee settlement located in Palorinya Parish of Moyo District, Northern Uganda. The camp is home to over 34,405 refugees.

Social Services 

Bible Study Groups have been formed in Morobi.

Governance 
In the Morobi refugee camp, hundreds of thousands of people were given 30x30 plots of land on which they built houses and cultivated crops.

References 

Refugee settlements